Valle del Miño-Ourense (or in Galician, Val do Miño-Ourense) is a Spanish geographical indication for Vino de la Tierra wines located in the autonomous region of Galicia. Vino de la Tierra is one step below the mainstream Denominación de Origen indication on the Spanish wine quality ladder.

The area covered by this geographical indication include the municipalities of O Pereiro de Aguiar; Coles; Ourense; Barbadás; Toén; and San Cibrao das Viñas (located in the province of Ourense, in Galicia, Spain).

It acquired its Vino de la Tierra status in 2001.

Grape varieties
 Red: Mencía, Caíño, Mouratón, Sousón, Cabernet franc, Garnacha tintorera and Bracellao
 White: Palomino, Treixadura, Torrontés, Albariño, Loureiro, Riesling, Doña Blanca and Godello

References

Spanish wine
Wine regions of Spain
Wine-related lists
Appellations